Kevin Barry Ryan (born 22 July 1949 in Auckland) is a retired male long-distance runner from New Zealand, who represented his native country in the men's marathon at the 1976 Summer Olympics in Montreal, Quebec, Canada. He was also a member of the ill-fated 1980 Olympic team which at the last minute boycotted the Moscow Olympics in support of the USA's boycott.

Furthermore, he was a member of the NZ team at three consecutive Commonwealth Games, starting in 1974. In 1983 he won the Honolulu Marathon.

During most of his career Ryan was coached by the New Zealand legend, Barry Magee, who had also been a world class marathoner during the height of his career.

In 1978 Ryan held the number 10 world ranking in the marathon for his effort in the Boston Marathon, which saw him place sixth in a time of 2:11:44.  In 1979 Kevin held the world ranking of 22nd for his time of 2:12:33 in the Fukuoka Marathon.

Ryan ran many marathons during his career, a few of which are listed below:

Achievements

References
 Kevin Ryan at the ARRS

External links
 
 

1949 births
Living people
New Zealand male long-distance runners
New Zealand male marathon runners
Athletes from Auckland
Athletes (track and field) at the 1976 Summer Olympics
Olympic athletes of New Zealand
Athletes (track and field) at the 1974 British Commonwealth Games
Athletes (track and field) at the 1978 Commonwealth Games
Athletes (track and field) at the 1982 Commonwealth Games
Commonwealth Games competitors for New Zealand